1899–1900 was the third year of basketball at Michigan State Normal School. Both games were played against Michigan State University. Michigan State Normal School ended up splitting the games and finished 1–1. It was the only year for coach Leslie A. Butler.

Roster

The team captain was H.W. Conklin.

Schedule

|-
!colspan=9 style="background:#006633; color:#FFFFFF;"| Non-conference regular season

Eastern Michigan Media Guide and school yearbook list two games played while Michigan State Media Guide only list one.

References

Eastern Michigan Eagles men's basketball seasons
Michigan State Normal